Rawshan Ara Mustafiz is a Bangladeshi singer of Nazrul Sangeet genre. She was awarded Ekushey Padak in 2006 by the Government of Bangladesh.

Early life and career
Mustafiz learned music from her mother Rashida Khatun Chowdhury and started to perform in children's programs on radio at the age of six. She wrote a book on music titled Shurer Bhubon for learners.

Mustafiz got her breakthrough  when her songs O Madhobi Thako Mor Ontorey and Brihoshpoti Amar Ekhon Tunggey aired on Bangladesh Television. In the 1970s, she focussed on Nazrul songs as well as classical music on Bangladesh Betar and Bangladesh Television. She trained under Ustad Yusuf Khan Koraishi, Ustad Gul Mohammad Khan and others.

Mustafiz is a trustee member of Nazrul Institute.

Awards
 Ekushey Padak (2006)
 Nazrul Academy Award (2009)
 Nazrul Institute Gold Medal
 Shilpaklala Academy Award

Works
 Tomar Hatey Shonar Rakhi (2005)

References

External links
 

Living people
21st-century Bangladeshi women singers
21st-century Bangladeshi singers
Recipients of the Ekushey Padak in arts
Bangladeshi Nazrul Geeti singers
Place of birth missing (living people)
Year of birth missing (living people)
Honorary Fellows of Bangla Academy
20th-century Bangladeshi women singers
20th-century Bangladeshi singers